HMS Rover was a  designed and built by Vickers Shipbuilding and Engineering in Barrow-in-Furness for the Royal Navy and was launched on 11 June 1930. During its early career, Rover served in the Far East. During World War II, the submarine operated in the Mediterranean Sea, attacking several Italian convoys and providing assistance to the crippled cruiser HMS York during the evacuation of Crete in 1941, before returning to the Far East to operate against the Japanese. The vessel survived the war and was sold for scrap in 1946.

Design and construction
Ordered by the Royal Navy on 28 February 1929, the submarine was laid down on 24 July 1929 by Vickers Shipbuilding and Engineering, at Barrow-in-Furness. Carrying a crew of 53 officers and ratings, the submarine displaced  surfaced and  submerged, and was armed with eight 21-inch (533 mm) torpedo tubes (six in the bow and two in stern) with 14 spare torpedoes for reloads, and one 4.7 in QF Mark IX deck gun. Propulsion was provided by two Admiralty diesel engines, producing , which were used when the vessel was surfaced, and two electric motors, producing  to power the vessel's two shafts when submerged. The vessel was capable of sailing at  when surfaced and  when submerged. It was launched on 11 June 1930 and construction was completed on 29 January 1931.

Operational service
After being commissioned into the Navy on 29 January 1931, Rover was assigned to the 4th Submarine Flotilla, and deployed to China Station. At the outbreak of World War II, Rover was still part of the 4th Submarine Flotilla, serving east of Suez. The submarine was based at Hong Kong until transferring to Singapore in early 1940. While there, it undertook anti-submarine training with Royal Australian Navy vessels deploying to the Mediterranean. Rover was then stationed in the Mediterranean, moving to Aden in August 1940, and arriving in Alexandria in October. The following month, the submarine began patrol operations and in early 1941 Rover attacked several Italian convoys.

In April 1941, amidst the Battle of Crete, Rover arrived at Souda Bay from Alexandria to assist in an attempt to salvage the disabled the heavy cruiser , which had been severely damaged by Italian MT boats. Rover was used to provide electrical power to operate anti-aircraft guns during the operation, but on 24 April 1941, the submarine was bombed and had to be towed to Alexandria to receive temporary repairs before being towed to Singapore for more permanent repairs in late 1941. In early 1942, as the Japanese advanced down the Malay Peninsula towards Singapore, Rover was moved to Bombay, in India, where repairs were completed.

At the conclusion of repairs, Rover operated out of Trincomalee, Ceylon, escorting several convoys and sinking a total of ten Japanese ships. In 1945, Rover took part in anti-submarine training, before being sold to Joubert of Durban.

Rover was the only submarine in her class to survive the war and had a total of six commanders during the war. She was scrapped on 30 July 1946.

References

External links
Information and Photographs on HMS Rover
Fact and Figures on HMS Rover 

 

Rainbow-class submarines
Ships built in Barrow-in-Furness
1930 ships
World War II submarines of the United Kingdom
Maritime incidents in April 1941